Adler may refer to:

Places
Adler, Alabama, an unincorporated community in Perry County
Adler Planetarium, Chicago, Illinois, USA
Adler Township, Nelson County, North Dakota, USA
Adler University, formerly Adler School of Professional Psychology, in Chicago, Illinois, USA
Adlersky City District, Sochi, Russia
Adler Microdistrict, a resort in Sochi, Russia
Adler railway station, a station serving the city

Sports
Adler Mannheim, a German ice hockey team
Berlin Adler, an American football team in Berlin
Nickname of the sports club Eintracht Frankfurt
Nickname for the Germany national football team

Transportation
, a number of steamships
Adler (cars and motorcycle), an early 20th-century automobile.  The firm also produced typewriters and other office equipment. 
Adler (locomotive), the first German steam locomotive (1835)
Adler or Adlerwerke vorm. Heinrich Kleyer, a German aircraft manufacturer

Other uses
Adler (band), an American rock band
Adler (comics), a Franco-Belgian comics series by René Sterne
Adler (surname), surname of Germanic origin
Adler Seeds, an American company based in Indiana
Operation Adler, three World War II military operations
Adler, the symbol of the Germanic eagle

See also
Adler-32, checksum algorithm
Adlertag, or the Day of the Eagle, German name for the first day of operations of the Battle of Britain in 1940